Craterellus tubaeformis (formerly Cantharellus tubaeformis) is an edible fungus, also known as yellowfoot, winter mushroom, or funnel chanterelle.  It is mycorrhizal, forming symbiotic associations with plants, making it very challenging to cultivate. It is smaller than the golden chanterelle (Cantharellus cibarius) and has a dark brown cap with paler gills and a hollow yellow stem. C. tubaeformis tastes stronger but less fruity than the golden chanterelle. It has a very distinctive smokey, peppery taste when raw. It grows in temperate and cold parts of Northern America and Europe, including Scandinavia, Finland, Russia, and the British Isles, as well as in the Himalayas in Asia, including Assam, in the central parts of the Indian subcontinent, and in Thailand.

C. tubaeformis is a yellowish-brown and trumpet-shaped mushroom found in great numbers late in the mushroom season, thus earning the common name winter mushroom. The cap is convex and sometimes hollow down the middle. The gills are widely separated, and of lighter color than the cap. It grows on moss or rotten wood, and in Northern America it is found mostly in conifer bogs.  It is an excellent food mushroom, especially fried or in soups, and is easily dried for preservation.

Molecular phylogenetics has shown that C. tubaeformis deserves its reclassification from Cantharellus to Craterellus.  Additionally, it appears that there are two distinct genetic populations that have traditionally been called tubaeformis: one in Europe and eastern North America, and another in western North America.  If these two groups are defined as separate species, the "eastern" yellowfoot would retain the scientific epithet tubaeformis due to the origin of the type specimens in Sweden.

The western North American C. tubaeformis has been shown to make ectomycorrhizal relationships with western hemlock (Tsuga heterophylla) and Douglas-fir (Pseudotsuga menziesii).  It is also most common in forests with a large amount of well-rotted coarse woody debris.

Description
The mushroom is mostly yellow-brown. The cap is 1–4 cm wide, generally flat with a depressed center, funnel-shaped, waxy, with a wavy margin, and mild odor and taste. The gills are shallow, decurrent, forked, and pale. The hollow stalk is 2–8 cm tall and 1 cm or less wide. The spores are whitish, elliptical, and smooth.

It usually fruits later than other mushrooms, sometimes near Hydnum repandum. It usually grows in large groups.

Similar species
The edible Craterellus lutescens differs in colour, and is found only in very wet places. Also similar is Cantharellus californicus.

Edibility
Though small, the mushroom is choice and grows in large groups.  It can be eaten with meat, in soups, pasta, and other dishes.

References

External links

 Craterellus tubaeformis MushroomExpert.com

Cantharellales
Edible fungi
Fungi of North America
Fungi of Europe
Fungi described in 1888